James Jackson Jarves (1818–1888) was an American newspaper editor, and art critic who is remembered above all as the first American art collector to buy Italian primitives and Old Masters.

Life and career
Jarves was the editor of an early weekly newspaper in the Hawaiian Islands, The Polynesian (1840–48). During the 1850s, Jarves relocated to Florence, Italy where he served as the U.S. vice-consul and collected art. After other American museums refused to buy Jarves' collection, Yale University granted him a loan with the collection as collateral. When Jarves defaulted in 1871, the Yale University Art Gallery purchased 119 Italian paintings, spanning the centuries from the tenth to the seventeenth, for a price of $22,000 or $30,000. The "Master of the Jarves Cassone", later discovered to be Apollonio di Giovanni di Tomaso, was named after him.

An honorary Hawaiian citizen, Jarves was awarded the order of Kamehameha I for his diplomatic services to Hawaii while empires fought to control it. The king of Italy appointed him Cavaliere della Corona d'Italia for his contribution to Italian art.'

Jarves married Elizabeth Russell Swain in 1838. One year after his first wife's death, Jarves in 1862 married Isabella Kast Heyden who died in 1887. In 1888 Jarves died of jaundice; he is buried on the English Cemetery in Rome.

Jarves and his second wife are, through their daughter Annabel, the great-great grandparents of Lady Elizabeth Marian Frances Kerr. Lady Elizabeth is the wife of Richard Scott, 10th Duke of Buccleuch and mother of the ducal heir. They are also the great-great-great grandparents of Henry Oliver Charles FitzRoy, 12th Duke of Grafton, whose mother is Lady Clare Amabel Margaret Kerr, widow of James FitzRoy, Earl of Euston and the sister of Lady Elizabeth Marian Frances Kerr.

Edith Wharton drew upon Jarves' well-known misfortunes in her novella False Dawn (The Forties).

Books
Some of his works:
 History of the Hawaiian or Sandwich Islands: Embracing Their Antiquities, Mythology, Legends, Discovery by Europeans in the Sixteenth Century, Re-Discovery by Cook, with Their Civil, Religious and Political History, from the Earliest Traditionary Period to the Present Time (1843)
 Scenes and Scenery in the Sandwich Islands, and a trip through Central America: being observations from my notebooks during the years 1837-1842 (1843)
 Parisian Sights and French Principles, Seen Through American Spectacles (1852)
 Parisian Sights and French Principles, Seen Through American Spectacles, Second Series (1855)
 Art-Hints, Architecture, Sculpture and Painting (1855)
 Italian Sights and Papal Principles, Seen Through American Spectacles (1856)
 Kiana: A Tradition of Hawaii (1857)
 Why and What Am I? The Confessions of an Inquirer, In Three Parts. Part I. Heart-Experience; or, The Education of the Emotions (1857)
 Art Studies: The "Old Masters" of Italy; Painting (1861)
 The Art-Idea: Part Second of Confessions of an Inquirer (1864)
 Art Thoughts, The Experiences and Observations of an American Amateur in Europe (1870)
 A Glimpse at the Art of Japan (1876)
 Italian Rambles, Studies of Life and Manners in New and Old Italy (1883)
 Pepero, the Boy-Artist. A Brief Memoir of James Jackson Jarves, Jr. (1891)

Articles
This list is incomplete.
 Jarves, J. Jackson, Genius of Doré. The Atlantic Monthly, vol. 24, issue 143 (September 1869).
 Jarves, J. Jackson, Asceticism, or the Sanctuary of St. Francis. The Galaxy, vol. 8, issue 4 (Oct 1869).
 Jarves, J. Jackson, [The Believer and the Unbeliever in English Art] "The Art Journal", 1 August 1869.
 Jarves, J. Jackson, Museums of Art. The Galaxy, vol. 10, issue 1 (July 1870).
 Jarves, J. Jackson, A new Phase of Druidism. The Galaxy, vol. 10, issue 6 (December 1870).
 Jarves, James Jackson, Pescaglia, the Home of a Mad Artist. The Atlantic Monthly, vol. 34, issue 203 (September 1874).
 Jarves, J. Jackson, Ethics of Taste. The Duty of Being Beautiful "The Art Journal", New Series Vol. 1 (1875)
 Jarves, James Jackson, American Museums of Art. Scribner's Monthly, vol. 18, issue 3 (July 1879).
 Jarves, James Jackson, The New School of Italian Painting and Sculpture. Harper's New Monthly Magazine, vol. 60, issue 358 (March 1880).
 Jarves, James Jackson, Ancient and Modern Venetian Glass of Murano. Harper's New Monthly Magazine, vol. 64, issue 380 (January 1882).
 Jarves, James Jackson, The Gates of Paradise. Harper's New Monthly Magazine, vol. 65, issue 385 (June 1882).

Notes

See also
Coins of Hawaii
 Deming Jarves, his father

References
 Jarves's A Glimpse at the Art of Japan. The Atlantic Monthly, vol. 37, issue 224 (June 1876).
 Jarves's Art-Hints. The North American Review, vol. 81, issue 169 (October 1855).
 Jarves's Art-Thoughts. The Atlantic Monthly, vol. 25, issue 148 (February 1870).
 Jarves's History of the Sandwich Islands. The North American Review, vol. 57, issue 120 (July 1843).
 Jarves's Parisian Sights and French Principles. Putnam's Monthly Magazine, vol. 7, issue 40 (April 1856).
Sirén, Osvald. A Descriptive Catalogue of the Pictures in the Jarves Collection Belonging to Yale University (New Haven: Yale University Press, 1916)
Steegmuller, Francis. The Two Lives of James Jackson Jarves (New Haven: Yale University Press, 1951)
Sturgis, Russell. Manual of the Jarves Collection of Early Italian Pictures (New Haven: Yale University Press, 1868)

External links
 
James Jackson Jarves, Dictionary of Art Historians
James Jackson Jarves (1818–1888) Papers, Manuscripts and Archives, Yale University Library
McKeever, Mary. Guide to the James Jackson Jarves Papers, Yale University Library, May 1972
James Jackson Jarves, Yale University Art Gallery
The cleaning and restoration of Antonio Pollaiuolo's Hercules and Deianira, Yale University Art Gallery
Hoeniger, Cathleen. The restoration of the early Italian "Primitives" during the 20th century: Valuing art and its consequences, Journal of the American Institute for Conservation 1999, Volume 38, Number 2, Article 3 (pp. 144 to 161)
Branch, Mark Alden. Lost and Found, Yale Alumni Magazine, May 2000

1818 births
1888 deaths
19th-century American diplomats
American art critics
Place of birth missing
American art collectors
19th-century American journalists
American male journalists
19th-century American male writers
Ambassadors of the Hawaiian Kingdom